Rizvan Kurbanov (January 3, 1961, Buynaksk, Dagestan Autonomous Soviet Socialist Republic) is a Russian political figure and deputy of the 6th, 7th, and 8th State Dumas.

Kurbanov worked at the Dagestan prosecutor's office first as an investigator then as the deputy prosecutor of the republic. Later he continued his career at the Department of the Ministry of Justice for the Central Federal District. In 2010 he was appointed first vice-president of Dagestan. Next year, he was elected deputy of the 6th State Duma. In 2016 and 2021, he was re-elected for the 7th, and 8th State Dumas. In the Duma, he joined the Committee on Security and Anti-Corruption and Commission for the Investigation of the Interference of Foreign States in the Internal Affairs of Russia

In 2010, Kurbanov was granted a Doctor of Sciences in Juridical sciences degree. However, in 2018 he was accused of plagiarism by professor Alexey Grishkovets who recognized in Kurbanov's work his own dissertation defended in 2004.

Awards  

 Order of Courage

References

1961 births
Living people
United Russia politicians
21st-century Russian politicians
Eighth convocation members of the State Duma (Russian Federation)
Seventh convocation members of the State Duma (Russian Federation)
Sixth convocation members of the State Duma (Russian Federation)